The Sarhad Rural Support Programme (SRSP) is the largest non-governmental organization working to alleviate poverty in North West Pakistan. It was established in 1989  with the aim of reducing poverty and ensuring sustainable means of livelihood in what is now Khyber Pakhtunkhwa, Pakistan. SRSP is part of the Rural Support Programmes (RSP's) initiated by United Nations Environment Programme Global 500 Award winner Shoaib Sultan Khan. It is now the largest regional RSP, with extensive outreach into communities. In recent years because of its vast outreach, SRSP has had to play a prominent role in disasters that have hit Khyber Pakhtunkhwa. As a result, humanitarian work along with development has become a core competency of the organization.

Formation
SRSP began it operations in 1989. It was established by members of the civil society, members of the government in their individual capacities, and members of the academia, media and training institutions. SRSP was created to replicate the Rural Support Programmes approach from the province now called Khyber Pakhtunkhwa.

Approach

SRSP's framework is based on the Rural Support Programmes (RSP's) approach to community empowerment, and economic and livelihood development.  At the heart of this approach is the belief that marginalized communities and disadvantaged people have within them the capacity for self-help. Pakistan’s Rural Support Program (RSP) movement pioneered bottom-up, community-driven development using a flexible, autonomous, politically neutral approach, which has been replicated successfully across PakistanPakistan as well as in India and Bangladesh.

Programmes

SRSP specialises in social mobilisation, gender and development, community infrastructure, education, micro-finance, micro-enterprise development, governance, conflict resolution, humanitarian assistance, and human resource development.

SRSP’s wide array of programmes includes support for developing/sustaining/advancing:
Community physical infrastructure 
Renewable energy  
Community investment/livelihoods funds, microcredit, village banks 
Social sector services 
Human resource development 
Enterprise and value chain development  
Development and humanitarian programmes 
Legal empowerment 
Education 
Health care

Achievements

Since its inception, SRSP has emerged as the largest non-government, non-profit organization in Khyber Pakhtunkhwa. It works in 22 out of 25 districts in the province. In 2007 it also initiated a programme for community empowerment and economic development in parts of the Federally Administered Tribal Areas (FATA).

SRSP has organized over 21,000 Community Organizations, covering  500,000 households; one third of the members being women. It has established over 7,000 small-scale infrastructure schemes worth PKR 32.6 billion benefiting a population of more than 10 million. Its major community infrastructure schemes include drinking water supply schemes, farm to market link roads and bridges, sanitation schemes, irrigation channels, micro-hydels, mini dams and rehabilitation of schools. SRSP has also installed more than 180 micro hydro power plants across Khyber Pakhtunkhwa, with production capacities ranging from 20 kilo-watts to 2 mega-watts.

SRSP has played a significant role in leveraging resources and providing humanitarian assistance to disasters affected communities in Khyber Pakhtunkhwa and its contribution has been acknowledged by the Federal and Provincial Government. During the earthquake of 2005, it helped rebuilt 62,000 houses in one of the biggest community driven housing programmes, funded by the Pakistan Poverty Alleviation Programme (PPAF). In addition to this, 40 public, public-private and community-based schools were reconstructed enabling over 5000 children to return to  school.  Following the IDP crisis in Pakistan of 2009 and the Pakistan floods of 2010, SRSP emerged as one of the largest implementing partners for United Nations High Commissioner for Refugees (UNHCR), reaching out to over 3.5 million Internally Displaced Persons (IDP's). SRSP has reached out to over 263,000 families with its flood response projects and programmes.

SRSP, has remained one of the main partners of the government in the health sector and ran 570 basic health units (BHUs) throughout the province in 17 districts.

Donors/Partners
SRSP has worked with a multitude of bilateral and multilateral donors, partners and international and national NGOs including:

 Federal Government of Pakistan
 Government of Khyber Pakhtunkhwa
European Union (EU) 
United Nations Development Programme (UNDP) 
United States Agency for International Development (USAID) 
Canadian International Development Agency (CIDA)  
Imran Khan Foundation (IKF)  
Pakistan Army
Office of the United Nations High Commissioner for Refugees (UNHCR) 
United Nations Educational, Scientific and Cultural Organization (UNESCO) 
United Nations Population Fund (UNFPA) 
Pakistan Poverty Alleviation Fund (PPAF)  
Australian Agency for International Development (Australian Aid)  
Department for International Development (DFID)  
British Council 
Foundation for Open Society Institute (OSF) 
United Nations Children's Fund (UNICEF)  
Deutsche Gesellschaft für Internationale Zusammenarbeit (GIZ) 
PATRIP Foundation 
Kreditanstalt fur Wiederaufbau (KfW) 
Federal Republic of Germany
World Bank (WB) 
Swiss Agency for Development and Cooperation (SDC) 
World Food Programme (WFP) 
Food and Agriculture Organization of the United Nations (FAO) 
World Health Organization (WHO) 
Citibank
International Rescue Committee (IRC) 
International Union for Conservation of Nature (IUCN) 
Save the Children
Alif Ailaan
International Federation of Red Cross and Red Crescent Societies (IFRC)

References

Medical and health organisations based in Pakistan
Rural development in Pakistan
Non-profit organisations based in Pakistan
Organisations based in Khyber Pakhtunkhwa